James William Moore (February 12, 1818 – September 17, 1877) was an American judge and politician from Montgomery County, Kentucky. He represented Kentucky in the Confederate States Congress during the American Civil War.

Moore was born in Montgomery County, Kentucky. Moore served as a Kentucky state court judge from 1851 to 1858. In 1861 he became a delegate to the Kentucky Secessionist Convention and represented the state in the First Confederate Congress and the Second Confederate Congress from 1862 to 1865. James Moore died on September 17, 1877, and was buried in Machpelah Cemetery.

External links
 Political Graveyard
 

1818 births
1877 deaths
Kentucky state court judges
Members of the Confederate House of Representatives from Kentucky
19th-century American politicians
People from Montgomery County, Kentucky
19th-century American judges